Felix Stridsberg-Usterud (born 3 November 1994) is a Norwegian freestyle skier.

Felix competed in the 2017–18 FIS Freestyle Ski World Cup and represented Norway in slopestyle at the 2018 Winter Olympics in PyeongChang.

References

External links
 
 
 
 

1994 births
Living people
Sportspeople from Bærum
Norwegian male freestyle skiers 
Freestyle skiers at the 2018 Winter Olympics
Olympic freestyle skiers of Norway